Zhigaylovka is a rural locality (a selo) and the administrative center of Zhigaylovskoye Rural Settlement, Korochansky District, Belgorod Oblast, Russia. The population was 590 as of 2010. There are 7 streets.

Geography 
Zhigaylovka is located 19 km southeast of Korocha (the district's administrative centre) by road. Trud is the nearest rural locality.

References 

Rural localities in Korochansky District